Ghost Town Parade is the third studio album by Les Dudek. It was released in 1979 on Columbia Records.

Track listing
Side 1
 (1) "Central Park" - 5:11
 (2) "Bound to Be a Change" - 3:14
 (3) "Gonna Move - 4:12
 (4) "Friend of Mine" - 6:08

Side 2
 (5) "Does Anybody Care" - 4:01
 (6) "Down to Nothin" - 5:09
 (7) "Tears Turn into Diamonds" - 2:56
 (8) "Falling Out" - 3:39
 (9) "Ghost Town Parade" - 4:58

Charts

Personnel
Les Dudek : guitars; vocals
Mike Finnigan : keyboards; backing vocals
Jim Kreuger  : guitar on 2, 4
Max Gronenthal  : keyboards on 1, 3, 5, 6, 7, 8, 9 ; backing vocals on 3, 7, 8, 9
Robert Powell  : bass on 1, 3, 5, 6, 7, 8, 9
Gerald Johnson  : bass on 2, 4
Jim Keltner : drums on 2, 4
Jeffrey Porcaro : drums on 2, 4
Gary Mallaber : drums on 1, 3, 5, 6, 8, 9
Carmine Appice : drums on 1, 3, 5, 6, 7, 8, 9
Patrick Murphy  : percussion on 1, 2, 4, 5, 6
Jack Bruce  : backing vocals on 1, 5, 6
Produced by Bruce Botnick
Recorded and Mixed by Andy Johns
String and horn arrangements by Allan Macmillan, except 09 by Jerry Long

References

1978 albums
Les Dudek albums
Albums produced by Bruce Botnick
Columbia Records albums